Ukuwela Railway Station is a railway station on the Matale railway line of Sri Lanka. It is the 65th railway station on the line from Colombo Fort railway station and is located in the Matale District in the Central Province. The station was opened on 14 October 1880 following the construction of a branch line from Kandy to Matale.

Location

Continuity

References

Railway stations on the Matale Line
Railway stations opened in 1880
Railway stations in Matale District